Hesperilla malindeva, commonly known as the malindeva skipper or two-spotted sedge-skipper, is a species of butterfly in the family Hesperiidae. It is found in the Australian states of New South Wales and Queensland.

The wingspan is about 30 mm. The species common name refers to two dark greenish brown spots on the hindwing underside, although these markings are sometimes absent. Males are often observed perching on shrubs and dead branches around 30 m above the ground.

The larvae feed on Gahnia aspera. They make a shelter by rolling leaves of their host into a tube. They remain in this shelter during the day and come out to feed at night.

References

External links
Australian Insects
Australian Faunal Directory

Trapezitinae
Butterflies described in 1911